Warren Wishart (born 17 February 1971) is an Australian cricketer. He played seven first-class matches for Western Australia in 1993/94.

References

External links
 

1971 births
Living people
Australian cricketers
Western Australia cricketers
Cricketers from Perth, Western Australia